Yurqunabad-e Olya (also Romanized as Yūrqūnābād-e ‘Olyā) is a village in Bash Qaleh Rural District, in the Central District of Urmia County, West Azerbaijan Province, Iran. At the 2006 census, its population was 408, in 110 families.

References 

Populated places in Urmia County